In enzymology, a ferric-chelate reductase is an enzyme that catalyzes the chemical reaction

2 Fe(II) + NAD+  2 Fe(III) + NADH + H+

Thus, the two substrates of this enzyme are Fe(II) and NAD+, whereas its 3 products are Fe(III), NADH, and H+.

This enzyme belongs to the family of oxidoreductases, specifically those oxidizing metal ion with NAD+ or NADP+ as acceptor.  The systematic name of this enzyme class is Fe(II):NAD+ oxidoreductase. Other names in common use include ferric chelate reductase, iron chelate reductase, NADH:Fe3+-EDTA reductase, and NADH2:Fe3+ oxidoreductase.

References

 
 
 
 
 

EC 1.16.1
NADH-dependent enzymes
Enzymes of unknown structure